Choi Ye-na (born September 29, 1999), known mononymously as Yena, is a South Korean singer and actress. She is a former member of temporary girl group Iz*One after finishing fourth on Mnet's reality girl group survival show Produce 48. She is currently a soloist and actress under Yuehua Entertainment. Yena made her solo debut on January 17, 2022, with the release of her first EP Smiley.

Early life
Choi was born on September 29, 1999, in Gil-Dong, Gangdong, South Korea. She is the younger sister of singer and actor Choi Sung-min. As a child, she was diagnosed with lymphoma.

Career

Pre-debut
She is a former Polaris Entertainment trainee before joining Yuehua Entertainment. Choi was a host for SBS' Cooking Class in 2017.

2018–2021: Produce 48, Iz*One, solo activities

From June 15 to August 31, 2018, Choi (together with Everglow members Kim Si-hyeon and Wang Yiren) represented Yuehua Entertainment on reality girl group survival show Produce 48. She eventually placed fourth and debuted with Iz*One. The group's debut extended play (EP) Color*Iz was released on October 29, 2018, with "La Vie en Rose" serving as its lead single.

Following her debut with Iz*One, Choi became a cast member for Prison Life of Fools, alongside Got7's JB, Jang Do-yeon, Jeong Hyeong-don and many more. 

On December 21, 2020, Choi was announced as one of the cast members for mystery variety show Girls High School Mystery Class. The show is TVING's first original content variety show.

After Iz*One's disbandment in April 2021, Choi became a cast member of TVING's Idol Dictation Contest. She also joined the fixed MC panels for tvN Story's Fireworks Handsome and MBC's Game of Blood. On August 6, 2021, Choi was confirmed as the sole MC of Studio Waffle's web variety show Yena's Animal Detective. The web show started airing on August 24. Choi made her acting debut later that year portraying Oh Na-ri in the second season of the web series The World of My 17.

2022–present: Solo debut 
On January 1, 2022, Choi announced through her social media that she would make her solo debut with the EP Smiley on January 17. She made her broadcast debut on Mnet's M Countdown on January 20 performing "Smiley". On February 10, 2022, Choi earned her first ever music show win on Mnet's M Countdown.

Choi released her second EP, Smartphone, on August 3, 2022.

In January 2023, Choi released a poster confirming her comeback with her first single album, Love War, on January 16.

Discography

Extended plays

Single albums

Singles

Production credits

Filmography

Web series

Television shows

Web shows

Radio shows

Awards and nominations

Notes

References

External links

1999 births
Living people
South Korean female idols
South Korean women pop singers
21st-century South Korean women singers
Swing Entertainment artists
Yuehua Entertainment artists
South Korean dance musicians
Produce 48 contestants
Iz*One members
Hanlim Multi Art School alumni
Reality show winners
South Korean web series actresses
Japanese-language singers of South Korea